"Message in a Bottle" is the 14th episode of the fourth season of the American science fiction television series Star Trek: Voyager, the 82nd episode overall. It aired on January 21, 1998 on the UPN network.

Set in the 24th century, the series follows the adventures of the Starfleet and Maquis crew of the starship USS Voyager after they were stranded in the Delta Quadrant far from the rest of the Federation. Using an ancient alien relay network, the ship's holographic Doctor is transmitted to the Alpha Quadrant to make contact with Starfleet Command.

This episode features a new Federation ship design called the U.S.S. Prometheus, which was designed by Rick Sternbach for the show. The starship forms both a major plot element and theatrical location for Message in a Bottle. It is also the first episode to feature the new uniforms from Star Trek: First Contact in the series, despite that the Voyager crew had already continued to wear the original DS9 uniforms as they are stuck in the Delta Quadrant.

Production
Original design is based on a concept drawing submitted by a promotional contest winner hosted by UPN. The exterior of the fictional spacecraft depicted in the episode was created by Rich Sternbach and the special effect sequence done by Foundation Imaging. The interior sets of the same spacecraft were designed by Richard James. The exterior visual shots by Foundation were done using computer generated imagery.

Plot
Seven of Nine uses the newly extended range of the starship USS Voyager (NCC-74656)s sensors to locate an unattended network of alien sensor stations. Patching into this, she is able to locate a United Federation of Planets vessel in the Alpha Quadrant. Hoping to contact Starfleet after more than three years in the Delta Quadrant, Voyagers crew attempts to send a message along the relay but it is reflected back after degrading en route. Thinking that a holographic signal would not degrade, they send the Doctor, Voyagers Emergency Medical Hologram (EMH).

The Doctor arrives in the sickbay of the USS Prometheus, a secret experimental Federation warship. He learns from a dying crewman that the Romulans had learned of the prototype and captured it, killing all onboard. Being pursued by the USS Bonchune, the Romulans initiate the first test of the new multi-vector assault mode, in which Prometheus splits into three pieces to engage hostile ships.

Seeking assistance, the Doctor activates the Prometheuss EMH (Andy Dick), a Mark II version of the program. The Doctor learns from the other EMH of the Dominion War, which the Federation is fighting in and Romulans have not entered. The second EMH cites protocol for an EMH to deactivate when its vessel is taken over but Voyagers doctor notes that they cannot do so as both ships are at risk.

The Romulans do not view EMHs as threats. Using the pretense of an infection on board, the Doctor goes to the bridge to open the atmospheric filters to flood the ship with anesthetizing gas. The ruse fails but when he is captured and interrogated, the Doctor keeps the Romulans stalled long enough for the EMH Mark II to fool the ship's computer into opening the filters, permitting the distribution of the gas. Just after they take control, Prometheus is intercepted by three Romulan D'deridex-class warbirds.

Unfamiliar with the helm and weapons systems, the two EMH programs fail to fool the Romulans into leaving, before three more Starfleet vessels arrive. In the ensuing battle, all six other vessels target Prometheus. The EMH Mark II stumbles upon the command to put the ship into multi-vector assault mode. Prometheus overpowers and destroys one of the Romulan warbirds; the Romulans retreat and a Starfleet security detail arrives aboard.

On Voyager, the crew has learned that the sensor array was not abandoned but is claimed by the Hirogen, who announce themselves and demand that Voyager disconnect at once. Janeway tries to negotiate but the Hirogen officer is recalcitrant. Seven of Nine buys time to await the Doctor's return by stunning the officer with a feedback loop. The Doctor returns via the array with good news; he has briefed Starfleet Headquarters about Voyager, the first time Starfleet has heard from the vessel since it disappeared three years earlier. Voyager has been removed from Starfleet's list of destroyed ships and a message sent back, "You're no longer alone". Starfleet will attempt to help Voyager and will tell next of kin that the crew is alive.

Reception
The episode was ranked as one of the top 10 episodes of Star Trek: Voyager in 2018. In 2012, Den of Geek also ranked "Message in a Bottle" as one of the top ten episodes of Star Trek: Voyager.

In 2018, CBR rated the science fiction spacecraft the Prometheus presented in this episode, as the 3rd most powerful spacecraft in the Star Trek universe, noting the vehicle for its ability to operate with a very small crew size. The fictional spacecraft of Starfleet, the USS Prometheus, was rated as the 12th best spacecraft of Star Trek by Space.com in 2017.

In July 2019, Screen Rant ranked this episode as one of the top five episodes of the Star Trek: Voyager television series, noting it has a gritty situation but also comedic elements. That same year Screen Rant ranked the fictional spacecraft in this episode, the USS Prometheus as the 2nd fastest Federation Starfleet spacecraft. They note the experimental nature of the vessel in the Star Trek universe, and suggest that it might have been used to make contact with the missing-in-action Starfleet spacecraft the USS Voyager.

In 2020, SyFy Wire ranked this episode the 3rd best episode of Star Trek: Voyager, calling it a "fast paced action comedy" and praising Robert Picardo's performance with Andy Dick.

In 2020, Gizmodo listed this episode as one of the "must watch" episodes from season four of the show.

In 2020, Screen Rant said this was the 5th best episode of Star Trek: Voyager, based on an IMDB rating of 8.8 out of 10.

Home video releases 
In 2017, the complete Star Trek: Voyager television series was released in a DVD box set with special features.

Continuity
This episode is noted in the story arc of the Star Trek: Voyager show, as the first time that Voyager regains contact with The Federation since being stranded on the other side of the Galaxy. This provides a back-story for many character developments, such as an increased morale and hope of making it back to Earth, as well as establish backstory for further contact with Starfleet in later episodes.

Expanded Universe
A novel published in 2017 features the fictional spacecraft depicted in this episode, Star Trek Prometheus: Fire with Fire by Christian Humberg and Bernd Perplies. The same authors also wrote Star Trek Prometheus : The Root of All Rage published the following year.

See also
 Pathfinder (Star Trek: Voyager) (S6E10), one of the next times Voyager and Earth connect
 Ship in a Bottle (Star Trek: The Next Generation)

References

External links

 

 Voyager’s Visual Effects: Creating the CG Voyager with Rob Bonchune

Star Trek: Voyager (season 4) episodes
1998 American television episodes

it:Astronavi di Star Trek#Classe Prometheus